Hubert Ray Dunning (born October 26, 1926 in Clarksville, Tennessee, USA) is a religious scholar in the Church of the Nazarene and retired professor of theology at Trevecca Nazarene University.   He earned a PhD from Vanderbilt University in 1969.  Dunning is the author of many books, including Grace, Faith and Holiness.

He is a past President (1985) of the Wesleyan Theological Society, and received that society's lifetime achievement award in 2004.

Books authored by him are widely available in libraries around the world.

Bibliography 
Grace, Faith, and Holiness: A Wesleyan Systematic Theology. Kansas City, Missouri: Beacon Hill Press of Kansas City, 1988. .
A Layman's Guide to Sanctification. Kansas City, Missouri: Beacon Hill Press of Kansas City. 1991. 
The Second Coming: A Wesleyan Approach to the Doctrine of Last Things (editor). Beacon Hill Press of Kansas City. 1995. 
Reflecting the Divine Image: Christian Ethics in Wesleyan Perspective.  InterVarsity Press, 1998. 
The Whole Christ for the Whole World: A Wesleyan Perspective on the Work of Christ. Wipf and Stock, 2008. 
Abraham: The Test of Faith. Beacon Hill Press, Kansas City, 2012. 
Grace, Faith, and Holiness: 30th Anniversary Annotations. The Foundry Publishing, Kansas City, 2018. 
A community of faith: celebrating the church of Jesus Christ and its mission to the world. Kansas City, Mo. : Beacon Hill Press of Kansas City, 1997.  9780834116658.
Becoming Christlike disciples. Bloomington, IN : WestBow Press, 2010. .
Partakers of the divine nature: Holiness in the epistles of Peter. Salem, OH : Schmul Pub. Co.,2006.  9780880195164.
The fruit of the Spirit. Kansas City, MO : Beacon Hill Press of Kansas City, 1982.  9780834108066.
The quest for happiness: a Wesleyan view of the good life. Charleston, SC : [publisher not identified], 2016.  1522876987.
Our standard of conduct. Kansas City, Mo. : Beacon Hill Press, 1963. OCLC Number 21964654.

References 

1926 births
Living people
American members of the Church of the Nazarene
American theologians
Arminian theologians
Nazarene theologians
Systematic theologians
Trevecca Nazarene University faculty
Vanderbilt University alumni